Bcl-2-like protein 10 is a protein that in humans is encoded by the BCL2L10 gene.

The protein encoded by this gene belongs to the BCL-2 protein family. BCL-2 family members form hetero- or homodimers and act as anti- or pro-apoptotic regulators that are involved in a wide variety of cellular activities. The protein encoded by this gene contains conserved BH4, BH1 and BH2 domains. This protein can interact with other members of BCL-2 protein family including BCL2, BCL2L1/BCL-X(L), and BAX. Overexpression of this gene has been shown to suppress cell apoptosis possibly through the prevention of cytochrome C release from the mitochondria, and thus preventing caspase-3 activation. The mouse counterpart of this protein is found to interact with Apaf1 and forms a protein complex with Caspase 9, which suggests the involvement of this protein in APAF1 and CASP9 related apoptotic pathway.

References

Further reading

External links